Robert Maxwell (born 10 February 1945) is a New Zealand former cricketer. He played one List A match for Otago in 1970/71.

See also
 List of Otago representative cricketers

References

External links
 

1945 births
Living people
New Zealand cricketers
Otago cricketers
People from Gore, New Zealand